KTRN (104.5 FM, "104.5 KTRN") is a radio station licensed to serve White Hall, Arkansas, United States. The station's broadcast license is held by Bluff City Radio, LLC.

KTRN broadcasts an adult contemporary music format to the Pine Bluff, Arkansas, area.

The station was assigned the call sign KTRN by the Federal Communications Commission on December 18, 1996.

The station's call sign makes an appearance in Train's Play That Song Music video.

References

External links

TRN
Mainstream adult contemporary radio stations in the United States
Radio stations established in 1996
Jefferson County, Arkansas